Micronectria is a genus of fungi in the family Hyponectriaceae.

Species
As accepted by Species Fungorum;
Micronectria agharkarii 
Micronectria eugeniae 
Micronectria guaranitica 
Micronectria montenegrina 
Micronectria syzygii 

Former species;
 M. pterocarpi  = Sphaerulina pterocarpi, Mycosphaerellaceae
 M. unicaudata  = Ophionectria belonospora, Nectriaceae

References

Amphisphaeriales